The 2015 Birmingham Bowl was a college football bowl game played on December 30, 2015 at Legion Field in Birmingham, Alabama in the United States.  The tenth annual Birmingham Bowl featured a team from the Southeastern Conference against a team from the American Athletic Conference. The game was played at 11:00 a.m. CST and aired on ESPN. It was one of the 2015–16 bowl games that concluded the 2015 FBS football season.

Teams
The two Tigers teams were selected from the American Athletic Conference and the SEC conference.

Auburn Tigers

Memphis Tigers

Game summary

Source:

Statistics

Notes
 Ticket pricing is $50 for East and West reserved sideline seating and $30 for general admission corner seats.

References

Birmingham
Birmingham Bowl
Auburn Tigers football bowl games
Memphis Tigers football bowl games
2015 in sports in Alabama
December 2015 sports events in the United States